Ascarelli is a surname. Notable people with the surname include:

Devorà Ascarelli, Italian Jewish poet
Moses Vita Ascarelli (1826–1889), Italian physician, rabbi, and writer

See also
 Stadio Giorgio Ascarelli, stadium in Naples, Italy

Jewish surnames